1994 Yokohama Flügels season

Review and events

League results summary

League results by round

Competitions

Domestic results

J.League

Suntory series

NICOS series

Emperor's Cup

J.League Cup

Super Cup

International results

Asian Cup Winners' Cup

Player statistics

 † player(s) joined the team after the opening of this season.

Transfers

In:

Out:

Transfers during the season

In
Andrés Saavedra (to Sporting Gijón on June)

Out
Shūji Kusano (to Kashiwa Reysol on June)
Amarilla (on July)
Aldro (on December)
Andrés Saavedra (to Sporting Gijón on December)

Awards
none

References

Other pages
 J. League official site
 Yokohama F. Marinos official web site

Yokohama Flugels
Yokohama Flügels seasons